Here is a list of the award winners and the films for which they won.

See also

 Bengal Film Journalists' Association Awards
 Cinema of India

Bengal Film Journalists' Association Awards